Beauty and the Beast (alternatively: Cannon Movie Tales: Beauty and the Beast in United States, Die Schöne und das Biest in West Germany, La Bella e la Bestia in Italy, La Belle et la Bête in France) is a 1987 American/Israeli musical film, part of the 1980s film series Cannon Movie Tales. It is a contemporary adaptation of the classic tale of Beauty and the Beast by Jeanne-Marie Leprince de Beaumont, borrowing also elements from Villeneuve's version, such as the dream sequences. The film was shot entirely in Israel, and the taglines were: "The monster they feared was the prince she loved" and "The classic fairy tale about seeing with your heart".

Plot
A wealthy merchant lives an affluent life with his two sons, Oliver and Frederick, and three daughters, Bettina, Isabella and Beauty. Beauty, the youngest daughter, is the caretaker of her family; without her, none of the family can look after themselves, and she is constantly taking care of her siblings. Despite this, Beauty is not frustrated, but she wonders what she would do with her life if she did not devote it to her family.

After the merchant loses his wealth in a storm at sea, the family must renounce their luxurious life and move to the countryside, with Beauty once again taking charge. After a time, the family hear that their wealth may be returned, for a ship has made it to port. To celebrate, the father promises his children gifts of luxury, but Beauty merely wants a rose. The merchant realises it was a lost cause, for he is still as poor as he was when he left, and returns. He stops off at a beautiful castle where an unseen host treats him to good food and a warm bed. However, the old man plucks a rose from the garden, and the host demands that as punishment, Beauty must come to live with him. Beauty moves to the castle, and is alone for the first time in her life. Therefore, she realises what she wants to do with her life, and realises that the Beast (the formerly unseen host) is not a complete monster.

When Beauty's father takes her to the castle, the Beast gives him two chests of gold and horses to carry it, as compensation for giving up his daughter. It seems that while in the castle anything she wants magically appears. The Beast has magical powers and grants all her wishes. The only time they see each other is at diner. He holds a rose and each night asks, "Do you love me? Will you marry me?". She always replies "No." Every night she dreams of a prince whom she loves (despite it being only a dream). She is shocked when she finds paintings of this dream prince in Beast's castle.

Over time she is happy at the castle, but asks the Beast if she can visit her family, for she misses them. He allows her and says "Be back in one month, or I will die." Also time flows differently. In the castle it has been about a week, but to the outside world it has been a year. While with her family they learn how to care for themselves instead of Beauty having to take care of them. She thinks about Beast and has to return, against her family's urging her to stay.

Upon returning to the castle she finds Beast dying for her lateness. She cries and mourns, begging Beast not to die. That's when she realizes how much she cares for him. So he asks again "Will you marry me" she finally says "Yes." That breaks the curse and Beast heals. He also turns into the prince she been dreaming about. He tells her about the curse. All his former subjects reappear along with her family who can now visit her whenever they want. She and the prince wed, and she becomes a princess.

Cast
John Savage – Beast / Prince
Rebecca De Mornay – Beauty
Yossi Graber – Father
Michael Schneider – Kuppel
Carmela Marner – Bettina
Ruth Harlap – Isabella
Joseph Bee – Oliver
Jack Messinger – Frederick
Tzipi Mor – 1st Maid
Firat Kanter – 2nd Maid
Ya'ackov Ben-Sira – Bailiff (as Yaacov Ben-Sira)
Rafi Goldvasser – Acrobat / Juggler
Eduardo Hobshar – Acrobat / Juggler
Nitzan Zytzer – Acrobat / Juggler
Eran Lavy – Acrobat / Juggler
Deborah Sherph – Innkeeper
Amiram Atias – Statue

Soundtrack
 "Without Us"
Music and Lyrics by Lori McKelvey
Performed by Rebecca De Mornay, Carmela Marner, Ruth Harlap, Jack Messinger and Nick Curtis
 "This Life Is for Me"
Music and Lyrics by Lori McKelvey
Performed by George Little
 "If You See with Your Heart"
Music and Lyrics by Lori McKelvey
Performed by Rebecca De Mornay and John Savage
 "Wish for the Moon"
Music and Lyrics by Lori McKelvey
Performed by Rebecca De Mornay and John Savage

References

External links

 
 
 Beauty and the Beast at MGM

1987 films
1980s musical films
Films about families
Films based on Beauty and the Beast
Films set in castles
Films shot in Israel
Golan-Globus films
Films produced by Menahem Golan
Cannon Movie Tales
Films produced by Yoram Globus
1980s English-language films